QuteMol is an open-source, interactive, molecular visualization system. QuteMol utilizes the current capabilities of modern GPUs through OpenGL shaders to offer an array of innovative visual effects. QuteMol visualization techniques are aimed at improving clarity and an easier understanding of the 3D shape and structure of large molecules or complex proteins.
 Real Time ambient occlusion
 Depth Aware Silhouette Enhancement
 Ball and Sticks, space-filling  and Liquorice visualization modes
 High resolution antialiased snapshots for creating publication quality renderings
 Interactive rendering of large molecules and protein (100k atoms)
 Standard Protein Data Bank input.

See also 

 Molecular graphics
 Molecular modeling on GPU
 List of free and open-source software packages

References

External links
 

Molecular modelling software
Free science software
Chemistry software for Linux
Free 3D graphics software
Free software programmed in C++
Software that uses wxWidgets